The Ministry of Foreign Affairs of Georgia is a governmental body of Georgia responsible for protecting and promoting Georgia’s interest and its persons and entities abroad. The Ministry is led by the Minister of Foreign Affairs who is appointed by the Prime Minister of Georgia as a member of cabinet. The position is currently held by Ilia Darchiashvili, in office since 04 April 2022.

Activity 
Georgia's foreign service – the Ministry of Foreign Affairs, Diplomatic Missions and Consular Services - serve fundamental national interests and values anchored in the Constitution of Georgia, the Foreign Policy Strategy as well as the National Security Concept. The Ministry drives Georgia’s foreign policy to enhance the security and international status of the country, and promote its interests in an increasingly globalizing world.

History

Democratic Republic of Georgia 

The Ministry of Foreign Affairs was established on 26 May 1918, the same day Georgia declared its independence. Consequently, the foreign affairs commission, diplomatic missions, and other entities necessary for carrying out diplomatic work were formed abroad. The first Foreign Minister was Akaki Chkhenkeli, a political leader. In November 1918, Evgeni Gegechkori was appointed as the Minister of Foreign Affairs.  

The Ministry of Foreign Affairs was the main foreign policy agency of the Democratic Republic of Georgia. It held diplomatic negotiations on behalf of the government. The Ministry was accountable to the Parliament. The staff of the Ministry did not exceed 50 people and its structure was the following: 

The Minister of Foreign Affairs - Director of the Ministry, Deputy Director, Legal Counsel, Secretary of the Minister.
       Personnel Department - the Head of the Personnel Department of the Minister, executive secretary, driver.
       Political Department - the Head of the Department, the Head of the European Division, the Head of the Asian Division, executive secretaries of the        divisions, chancelleries and translators.
       General Department - the Head of the Department, executive secretary and his assistant, chancellery.
       Information Bureau - the Head of the Department, executive secretary, chancellery and translators.

Structure and Organization

Minister of Foreign Affairs

The Minister of Foreign Affairs is the chief executive officer of the Ministry and a member of the Cabinet who answers directly to, and advises, the Prime Minister of Georgia. The minister organizes and supervises the entire ministry and its staff.

Structure

Legal Entities of Public Law

o   LEPL - Information Center on NATO and EU

LEPL Information Center on NATO and EU was established in 2005 and, since 2017, operates under the Ministry of Foreign Affairs of Georgia. The Information Centre on NATO and EU aims to support Georgia’s European and Euro-Atlantic integration process through public diplomacy and strategic communication efforts, primarily focusing on maintaining and increasing knowledge-based public support towards the country's top foreign policy priorities - Georgia’s membership to the North Atlantic Treaty Organization and to the European Union.

o   LEPL - Levan Mikeladze Diplomatic Training and Research Institute

The goal of The Levan Mikeladze Diplomatic Training and Research Institute (DTRI) of the Ministry of Foreign Affairs of Georgia (MFA) is to promote the continuous professional development of MFA staff and those forming the diplomatic reserve, taking into consideration Georgian foreign policy priorities, existing needs and trends. The Centre also aims to raise the awareness of foreign diplomats accredited to Georgia and strengthen the capacity of public officials working in the area of international relations.

See also

 Foreign relations of Georgia
 Minister of Foreign Affairs of Georgia

References

External links 
https://mfa.gov.ge/ 

http://old.infocenter.gov.ge/

Foreign Affairs
 01
Foreign relations of Georgia (country)
Georgia
.F
Georgia, Foreign Affairs
1918 establishments in Georgia (country)
1918 establishments in Russia